Ravand-e Olya (also Romanized as Ravand-e ‘Olyā; also known as Ravand-e Bālā) is a village in Beradust Rural District, Sumay-ye Beradust District, Urmia County, West Azerbaijan Province, Iran. At the 2006 census, its population was 109, in 22 families.

References 

Populated places in Urmia County